The Beggar of Cawnpore is a 1916 American silent film directed by Charles Swickard and starring H.B. Warner, Lola May and Wyndham Standing. It is set against the backdrop of the 1857 Indian Mutiny.

Cast
 H.B. Warner as Dr. Robert Lowndes  
 Lola May as Betty Archer  
 Wyndham Standing as Capt. Guy Douglas  
 Alfred Hollingsworth as Mulhar Rao  
 Harold Entwistle as Col. Archer  
 Wedgwood Nowell as Werner, the Engineer

Preservation status
A print is preserved at the George Eastman House and the National Archives of Canada (Ottawa).

References

Bibliography
 Taves, Brian. Thomas Ince: Hollywood's Independent Pioneer. University Press of Kentucky, 2012.

External links

1916 films
American historical drama films
American silent feature films
1910s historical drama films
Films directed by Charles Swickard
Films set in the 1850s
Films set in India
Films about the Indian Rebellion of 1857
American black-and-white films
1916 drama films
1910s English-language films
1910s American films
Silent American drama films